Don Tallon was a key member of Donald Bradman's famous Australian cricket team tour of England in 1948, in which Australia was undefeated in their 34 matches. This unprecedented feat by a Test side touring England earned them the sobriquet The Invincibles.

The team's first-choice wicket-keeper ahead of Ron Saggers, Tallon played in four of the five Tests, missing the Fourth Test due to injury. Despite being the preferred gloveman, Tallon conceded byes at a higher rate than Saggers during the tour.

Bradman rotated the two glovemen during the tour, and Tallon played in 14 of the 31 first-class matches, taking 29 catches and 14 stumpings. Tallon's catch of Len Hutton in the Fifth Test at The Oval was described as Wisden as the best of the year. He also took a difficult catch to remove George Emmett in the Third Test at Old Trafford, catching a ball that flew to his feet at yorker length. However, Tallon also had some mishaps, with finger injuries inflicted by failing to catch the ball correctly. Tallon had few opportunities with the bat, scoring 283 runs at a batting average of 25.72 in 13 first-class innings, including two fifties. During the Test, Tallon scored 112 runs at 28.00, including a 53 in the Second Test that saw Australia recover to a first innings of 350 after a middle-order slump had seen England take the upper hand. He took 12 catches in the Tests.

In recognition of his performances, Tallon was named as one of the five Wisden Cricketers of the Year in 1949.

Background
Tallon's form as Australia's wicket-keeper since World War II saw him selected for the 1948 Ashes tour as part of the side that would become known to cricket history as the Invincibles. Tallon was the first-choice wicket-keeper, with Saggers as his deputy. Having spent the majority of his life in sunny Queensland and growing up in tropical Bundaberg, the cold English climate initially caught Tallon off guard. He did not wet his inner gloves as was his custom due to the temperature. As England agreed to make a new ball available every 55 overs, this meant that the ball would more frequently be in a favourable state for fast bowling, since it would swing more. As a result, Australia adopted a pace-oriented strategy and Ian Johnson was the only spinner regularly used in the Test matches. Colin McCool was not to play a Test on the tour, depriving Tallon of an opportunity to show his stumping abilities standing up at the stumps to his Queensland team-mate in the Tests.

Early tour
Australia traditionally fielded its first-choice team in the tour opener, which was customarily against Worcestershire. Accordingly, Tallon was selected as the wicket-keeper for the match. The home side batted first and Tallon made his first dismissal on English soil by catching Worcestershire captain Allan White from the bowling of Keith Miller. He then stumped former England captain Bob Wyatt from McCool. In reply to the hosts' 233, Tallon was promoted to No. 6, but managed only six in a collapse of 4/38 before Australia recovered to declare at 8/462. He took a further three dismissals in the second innings, two of them stumpings from McCool's bowling, as Australia crushed the hosts by an innings and 17 runs. Tallon conceded 11 byes in the match.

Tallon was rested for the second tour match against Leicestershire, which Australia won by an innings with Saggers behind the stumps.

Tallon played a key role in Australia's victory in the next match against Yorkshire, on a damp pitch that suited slower bowling. He came in at 7/86 and made ten in the first innings to push Australia to 101 in reply to Yorkshire's 71, in which Tallon did not concede a bye. However, Tallon was not so tidy in the second innings, conceding 11 byes as the hosts were bowled out for 89 in their second innings. He did not make a dismissal in the match. Australia then collapsed to 6/31 in pursuit of 60 for victory when Tallon strode in. To make matters worse, Sam Loxton was injured and could not bat, so Australia only had three wickets in hand. Australia faced its first loss to an English county since 1912. He survived an immediate leg before wicket appeal and then hit a shot that fell just short of a fielder. He then compiled 17 unbeaten runs as Australia scraped home by four wickets.

The Australians travelled to London to play Surrey at The Oval. Tallon came in with the score at 6/553, and held up his end, scoring an unbeaten 50 as his partners steadily fell and Australia were bowled out at 632. Tallon had some difficulty in English conditions as he sustained a bruised right finger when he lost sight of a Ray Lindwall bouncer on a misty morning during the match and was hit as he put hand over his face for protection, with the ball running away for four byes. Tallon took two catches in the second innings as Australia won the match by an innings, but he also conceded 24 byes in Surrey's match total of 336.

After sustaining the bruised finger, Tallon was rested for the following three matches, which were against Cambridge University, Essex and Oxford. Australia won each of the matches by an innings. Saggers filled in and scored 110 runs including a 104 not out against Essex and took five dismissals. Saggers conceded only 34 byes in his four tour matches, while Tallon had conceded 46 in three.N-

The next match was against the Marylebone Cricket Club (MCC) at Lord's. The MCC fielded seven players who would represent England in the Tests,N- and were basically a full strength Test team, as were Australia, who fielded their first-choice team. It was a chance to gain a psychological advantage, and Tallon was selected despite conceding byes at a higher rate in the preceding tour matches. He made 11 batting at No. 9, including a six from Jim Laker as Australia made 552. He took three catches in the first innings, having a hand in the first three wickets to fall, Jack Robertson, Bill Edrich and Denis Compton. He then took two stumpings in the second innings as the follow on was enforced, but also conceded 26 byes as Australia won by an innings. Tallon had conceded 72 byes to Saggers' 34 with both having played four matches.N-

Following the match against the MCC, there were four more county fixtures before the First Test, against Lancashire, Nottinghamshire, Hampshire and Sussex. Australia drew the first two before winning the latter two by eight wickets and an innings and 325 runs respectively. Tallon played in only the Nottinghamshire match, taking two catches in the first innings and two stumpings in each of the innings. The catches were all from Lindwall and the stumpings from Doug Ring. Tallon conceded 18 byes for the match and scored 27, being last man out at 400 after coming to the crease at 6/355. In Saggers's three matches, 36 byes were conceded and six dismissals were made.

First Test

Despite averaging more byes per innings than Saggers during the warm-up matches,N- Tallon was retained in the Test team.  During the First Test at Trent Bridge, Tallon took four catches. In the first innings, Tallon caught Jim Laker from the bowling of Keith Miller to end England's innings of 165 after he and Alec Bedser had joined forces at 8/74.

When Australia batted, Tallon came in at 6/338 to accompany Lindsay Hassett and took 39 minutes to compile 10 before hitting a return catch to the left arm orthodox spin of Jack Young. The scoring was slow during this passage of play—Young delivered 11 consecutive maiden overs and his 26-over spell conceded only 14 runs with Australia using leg theory.

After Australia ended with 509 and took a 334-run lead, Tallon took two difficult catches to dismiss key batsmen at the start of England's second innings. Miller removed Cyril Washbrook for one from a top-edged hook shot to Tallon. Bill Edrich was then caught behind attempting a cut from the off spin of Johnson. He did not read the arm ball that went straight on and the ball took the outside edge, leaving England at 2/39. He thus helped Australia to seize the initiative by denying England a good start, but they recovered. Later, he caught Godfrey Evans for 50 from Johnson as England ended at 441. Australia reached their target of 98 with two wickets down, completing an eight-wicket victory. Tallon conceded five and 12 byes in the two innings respectively.

Between Tests, Australia played Northamptonshire and Yorkshire, and Tallon was rested for both matches. The first was won by an innings and second was drawn. Saggers made four and 22 and conceded 24 byes in four innings.

Second Test

The teams moved on to Lord's for the Second Test and Australia compiled 350 in its first innings. Tallon came to the crease with Australia at 6/225 after Hassett and Bill Brown had gone in quick succession, joining Johnson in the middle. Johnson struggled to score, while Tallon did so freely in the last hour. After Johnson fell for four at 7/246, Lindwall then joined Tallon and the pair survived to the close of play. England were well placed when Australia ended at stumps on 7/258 with Tallon on 25. Tallon had dominated the scoring late in day, making 25 of the 33 runs added. The crowd was optimistic about England's position and some immediately camped outside the turnstiles upon leaving the ground.

Australia's lower order batted the tourists into control on the second morning. Despite the loss of Lindwall for 15 at 8/275, Tallon kept on batting in a conventional manner, supported by Johnston and Ernie Toshack, who scored their highest Test scores. Both tail-enders threw the bat at the ball, which often went in vastly different directions to where they had aimed their shots. Tallon put on 45 with Johnston—who scored 29— before holing out for 53. Ending at 350, the Australians had regained the momentum, taking 92 runs from 66 minutes of hitting in the morning.

Tallon did not concede a bye in England's first innings of 215 and his diving was estimated to have saved around 40 runs. He caught Washbrook from Lindwall to leave England at 1/17, and later caught Laker from Johnson. Tallon was not needed in the second innings; Lindwall was promoted above Tallon because Australia needed quick runs and Lindwall was a big-hitter. Australia declared at 7/460, leaving England a target of 509.

With the score at 2/65, Washbrook inside edged a Toshack full toss directly downwards at Tallon's ankle. Bradman described the catch as "miraculous" because Tallon had to reach so low, so quickly, in order to take the catch. Another dive to stop a leg glance resulted in a severely bruised left little finger. Tallon conceded 16 byes  in the second innings, more than 8% of England's score. Australia won the Test by 409 runs, and nursing his finger, Tallon was rested for both tour matches between the Tests, which were against Surrey and Gloucestershire, which were won by ten wickets and an innings respectively. In his place, Saggers scored 12, took nine dismissals and conceded 31 byes in four innings.

Third Test

The teams then played out a rain-affected draw in the Third Test match at Manchester, where England elected to bat first. On the first day, Edrich gloved a rising Lindwall delivery and was caught by Tallon for 32, leaving England at 5/119. Compton returned at the fall of Edrich's wicket after previously leaving the ground after being bloodied in the head by a Lindwall bouncer. He batted to stumps, after being dropped one-handed on 50 by Tallon, before again being dropped on 64 late in the day by the gloveman from the bowling of Johnston. England closed at 7/231 with Compton on 64.

On the second morning, Tallon again dropped Compton from Johnston when the batsman was on 73. England eventually finished on 363, with Compton not out on 145. Thus Tallon's drops cost 95 runs as well as allowing Compton to hold up one end so his partners could score. Tallon also conceded seven byes.

Australia reached 3/135 when Miller and Arthur Morris departed in quick succession. With Sid Barnes retiring hurt because of a blow to the ribs, Tallon came in at 5/139, effectively six wickets down and made 18 in half an hour before falling at 6/172. Australia managed to reach 221 and avoid the follow on.

England batted again and Tallon dismissed George Emmett from Lindwall with a diving one-handed catch. Lindwall pitched an outswinger on the off stump and Emmett edged it to wicket-keeper Tallon, who took it in his right hand with a dive, leaving England at 1/1. England then declared at 3/174; Tallon conceded nine byes and with more than a day was lost to rain, Tallon was not required as Australia batted out the last session for a draw.

Tallon's little left finger swelled up after the Third Test and he exacerbated the injury during a tour match against Middlesex. In this match, he scored 17, took two catches and a stumping in the first innings and conceded only seven byes for the entire match as Australia won by ten wickets.

Fourth Test

The left finger injury ruled him out of the Fourth Test at Headingley, and he was replaced by Saggers.  Australia set a world record in successfully chasing a target of 404 to win the match by seven wickets and secure the series. Saggers leaked only six byes in 299.1 overs of glovework during the match as Australia conceded a total of 861 runs for the match. It was the lowest percentage of byes conceded in a match total by an Australian wicket-keeper for the tour (0.697%).N-

Tallon missed the innings victory over Derbyshire, before returning against Glamorgan. In his first match back from injury, Tallon took a catch and two stumpings as the hosts were dismissed for 197, but he also conceded 19 byes. Byes made 9.64% of the match total conceded by Australia, the highest proportion by the tourists during the summer.N- He did not bat as rain ended the match with Australia at 3/215. He was rested for the nine-wicket win over Warwickshire, before returning for Australia's second match and second draw against Lancashire. Tallon came in at 7/232 and scored 33, adding 63 with Ian Johnson to help Australia reach 321. He took two catches and two stumpings but also conceded 23 byes. In the non-first-class match against Durham, Tallon played purely as a batsman, while Saggers kept wicket. He opened the batting, but was dismissed for one as Australia made 273 and the hosts reached 5/73 before rain ended the match.

Fifth Test

Tallon returned for the Fifth Test at The Oval, where England elected to bat first on a rain-affected pitch. Tallon caught Jack Crapp from an outside edge for a duck from the bowling of Miller, leaving England at 4/23 as play was adjourned for lunch. England continued to struggle against the moving ball and were all out for 52 in the middle session. The innings ended when Tallon took an acrobatic catch to dismiss Len Hutton down the leg side, catching it with his left hand. It was considered the catch of the season by Wisden. Tallon conceded six byes in the innings.

Australia batted and passed England's total on the first afternoon. Tallon came in to bat on the second day with the score at 7/332, joining opener Morris, who had already passed 150. It took a run out to remove Morris; he attempted a quick run to third man after being called through by Tallon but was not quick enough for the substitute fielder's arm, leaving Australia at 8/359. Tallon, who scored 31, put on another 30 runs with Doug Ring, before both were out on 389, ending Australia's innings. In the second innings, Tallon caught Hutton from Miller and conceded nine byes as England were dismissed for 188 and lost by an innings, sealing a 4–0 series victory for Australia.

Later tour matches
Seven matches remained on Bradman's quest to go through a tour of England without defeat. Tallon was rested for three consecutive matches against Kent, the Gentlemen of England, and Somerset, all of which Australia won by an innings. Saggers stood in and made seven dismissals and conceded 29 byes in the six innings of the three matches.

He returned for the following match against the South of England. He did not bat as Australia declared at 7/522. He then took three catches and conceded 13 byes as the match was washed out when the hosts were dismissed for 298.

Australia's biggest challenge in the post-Test tour matches was against the Leveson-Gower's XI. During the last tour in 1938, this team was effectively a full-strength England outfit, but this time Bradman insisted that only six current England Test players be allowed to play for the hosts. Bradman then fielded a full-strength team, with the only difference from the Fifth Test team being Johnson coming for Doug Ring. Tallon made two as Australia declared at 8/489. He conceded seven byes and did not make a dismissal as the match ended in a draw after multiple rain delays.

The tour ended with two non-first-class matches against Scotland. In the first match, Tallon played as a batsman while Saggers kept wicket. Tallon scored only six in Australia's 236 and then took 0/10 in Scotland's second innings and did not take a catch in the innings victory. In the second match in Aberdeen, Tallon kept wicket, conceding 26 byes and not taking a dismissal and he was not required to bat. When the match became safe, with Australia in an unassailable position in Scotland's second innings, Bradman allowed Tallon to dispense with his wicket-keeping pads and try his luck at bowling leg spin. Tallon never bowled in his Test career and only rarely in first-class cricket, where he delivered 301 balls, the approximate workload of a specialist bowler in one match. Tallon took 2/15 as Australia finished the tour with another innings win.

Role

Tallon had had moderate success with his batting during the Test series, aggregating 114 runs at 28.50. He usually batted at No. 8, and only had four innings as Australia's batting strength was such that he did not need to bat in the second innings in any of the Tests. The Australian team strategy of primarily depending on fast bowling saw Tallon make 12 catches and no stumpings during the Tests. However, Bradman gave his lead pace bowlers Miller and Lindwall more rest during the tour games to save energy for the Tests, and relied more heavily on the off spin of Ian Johnson and the leg spin of McCool and Doug Ring in the county matches. Thus overall Tallon took 29 catches and 14 stumpings for the first-class matches during the tour. Tallon scored 283 runs at 25.72 for the season at an average higher than Saggers's 23.22. In all his matches on tour, Tallon conceded 249 byes as Australia conceded 5331 runs, a bye percentage of 4.67%, compared to Saggers's 221 byes from 6190 runs, a percentage of 3.57%.N-

During the tour, Tallon had few opportunities with the bat, generally batting between No. 8 and No. 9,N- because Australia's frontline bowlers included the likes of Ray Lindwall, Colin McCool, Ian Johnson and Doug Ring, who were all capable with the bat. Lindwall scored two Test centuries in his career, while McCool scored 18 first-class centuries, including one in Tests. Johnson and Ring both scored more than 20 fifties at first-class level. As Australia often won by an innings, and often declared in the first innings, Tallon only had 13 innings in his 14 first-class fixtures and was not out two times as he ran out of partners.

Tallon's performances during the English summer saw him named by Wisden as one of its five Cricketers of the Year.

Notes

Statistical notes 

n-[1]

This statement regarding byes in the early warm-up matches can be verified by summation of the scorecards, as listed here.

n-[2]

This statement regarding the team composition can be verified by inspecting the records of the respective matches, as attached.

n-[3]

This statement regarding byes in the warm-up matches can be verified by summation of the scorecards, as listed here.

n-[4]

This statement can be verified by consulting all of the scorecards for the matches, as listed here.

General notes

References

 

 

The Invincibles (cricket)